Roding may refer to:

 River Roding, Essex and Greater London, UK
 Roding Automobile, an automotive manufacturer based in Germany
 Roding, Germany, town in the Upper Palatinate of Bavaria
 Roding, sound produced during the mating display of snipes and woodcocks, also known as drumming
 The Rodings, group of villages in Essex, UK

Spelled Röding, this may refer to:
 Röding, the German malacologist, Peter Friedrich Röding